Palestine is a village in Crawford County, Illinois, United States. The population was 1,233 at the 2020 Census.

Geography

History
It is said that French explorer Jean Lamotte first gazed upon this region in 1678. He gave it the name Palestine, as it reminded him of  Palestine, the Biblical land of milk and honey.

Palestine was chartered in 1811, while the area still belonged to Virginia, and is one of the oldest towns in the State of Illinois. It was named the seat of Crawford County in 1818. Elections in 1843 moved the county seat to a new site, which would become the town of Robinson. It was officially incorporated as an Illinois town in 1855.

Demographics
As of the 2020 census there were 1,233 people, 578 households, and 347 families residing in the village. The racial makeup of the village was 94.97% White, 1.22% Asian, 0.41% from other races, and 3.41% from two or more races. Hispanic or Latino of any race were 0.81% of the population.

There were 578 households, out of which 39.27% had children under the age of 18 living with them, 38.75% were married couples living together, 18.86% had a female householder with no husband present, and 39.97% were non-families. 36.68% of all households were made up of individuals, and 15.05% had someone living alone who was 65 years of age or older. The average household size was 2.49 and the average family size was 2.08.

The village's age distribution consisted of 23.4% under the age of 18, 5.6% from 18 to 24, 17.7% from 25 to 44, 27% from 45 to 64, and 26.3% who were 65 years of age or older. The median age was 47.5 years. For every 100 females, there were 72.4 males. For every 100 females age 18 and over, there were 65.3 males.

The median income for a household in the village was $41,700, and the median income for a family was $49,732. Males had a median income of $41,458 versus $30,833 for females. The per capita income for the village was $24,531. About 8.4% of families and 12.6% of the population were below the poverty line, including 9.4% of those under age 18 and 6.3% of those age 65 or over.

Notable people
Fred Dubois, politician who served two terms in the United States Senate from Idaho.
Herschel S. Green, Illinois politician and lawyer
Madge Miller Green, Illinois politician and educator
Wickliffe Kitchell, Illinois politician and lawyer

See also
 Fife Opera House
 Fort Lamotte

References

External links
Palestine, Illinois Web page

Villages in Crawford County, Illinois
Villages in Illinois
Populated places established in 1811
1811 establishments in Illinois Territory